The list of ship launches in 1892 includes a chronological list of ships launched in 1892.  In cases where no official launching ceremony was held, the date built or completed may be used instead.


References 

1892
 Ship launches
 Ship launches
Ship launches